This is a list of museums in North Korea.

List 

International Friendship Exhibition
Kimilsungia and Kimjongilia Exhibition Hall
Korea Stamp Museum
Korean Art Gallery
Korean Central History Museum
Korean Folklore Museum
Korean Revolution Museum
Museum of Natural History,Pyongyang 
Korea Central Zoo
Museum of Weapons and Equipment of the Korean People's Army
North Korea Peace Museum
Party Founding Museum
Pyongyang Metro Construction Museum
Pyongyang Railway Museum
Pyongyang City Museum
Revolutionary Museum of the Ministry of the People's Armed Forces
Sinchon Museum of American War Atrocities
Three Revolutions Exhibition
USS Pueblo (AGER-2)
Victorious War Museum
Rangrang museum

See also 
 
 List of museums
 Revolutionary Sites

External links 

 Democratic People's Republic of Korea - Museums

 
North Korea education-related lists
Lists of buildings and structures in North Korea
North Korea
Museums
North Korea

Lists of organizations based in North Korea